Kerstin Palm (born 5 February 1946) is a Swedish fencer. She competed in seven Summer Olympics, which is a record for a female fencer, with the best result of fifth in the individual foil event in 1968. She was named Sportswoman of the Year in Sweden in 1965.

Palm won the Nordic foil championships in 1961, aged 15, and held the junior world title in 1966; she also won approximately 40 Swedish fencing championships. She continued competing in fencing up to her seventies, while working as a dentist. She won the seniors world championship title in 2005 and 2007.

See also
List of athletes with the most appearances at Olympic Games

References

1946 births
Living people
Swedish female foil fencers
Olympic fencers of Sweden
Fencers at the 1964 Summer Olympics
Fencers at the 1968 Summer Olympics
Fencers at the 1972 Summer Olympics
Fencers at the 1976 Summer Olympics
Fencers at the 1980 Summer Olympics
Fencers at the 1984 Summer Olympics
Fencers at the 1988 Summer Olympics
Universiade medalists in fencing
Universiade gold medalists for Sweden
Medalists at the 1967 Summer Universiade
Sportspeople from Malmö
20th-century Swedish women